Anneke Wills (born Anna Katarina Willys, 20 October 1941) is an English actress, best known for her role as the Doctor Who companion Polly in the long-running BBC science fiction television series Doctor Who.

Biography
Wills's father, Alaric Willys, was a captain in the British Army. Her mother, Anna, was Dutch, born in Rotterdam. Anneke is the granddaughter of Richard Raymond Willis VC.

Career
Deciding she wanted to be an actress she studied drama at the Arts Educational School and RADA in London and quickly became one of the busiest actresses of her generation, early roles included an appearance as Roberta in the second TV version of The Railway Children in 1957. Her other film roles included appearances in Some People (1962) and The Pleasure Girls (1965).

Her other television credits include appearances in The Avengers and as Evelyn in Strange Report (1969–70).

Doctor Who
In 1966, she took the role of Polly in Doctor Who. She appeared in the show until 1967 alongside William Hartnell and then Patrick Troughton.  Her favourite story is The Smugglers.

In October 2013, she recorded an abridged version of Who's There?, a biography of Hartnell written by his granddaughter, Jessica Carney.

In November 2013, she appeared in the one-off 50th anniversary comedy homage The Five(ish) Doctors Reboot.

She has been a popular guest at Doctor Who conventions, and has been employed by the BBC and Big Finish to record various audio and DVD projects related to the show.

Writing
The first volume of her autobiography, Self Portrait, was published in 2007 by Hirst Books and a second volume, Naked, followed in 2009. Her latest book, Anneke Wills - In Focus, was published in May 2012 by Fantom Films.

Personal life
At 17, she began a relationship with Anthony Newley while working on the TV series The Strange World of Gurney Slade. Newley fathered Wills's first child, Polly, but left her to marry Joan Collins. During the 1960s Wills spent much of her time at the famous Troubadour Coffee Shop and the Establishment, and was part of the so-called "Chelsea Set".

Wills married actor Michael Gough in 1965, who adopted her daughter Polly. The couple had one son, Jasper, and divorced in 1979. In 1970, she gave up acting and moved to Norfolk, dedicating herself to motherhood and gardening. Her daughter Polly died in a car crash in 1982 at the age of 18, believing that Gough was her biological father. She left the UK in 1980 and lived in various places in the 16 years afterwards, including in Belgium, Laos, Vietnam, and India in the early 1980s, in the USA from 1983–1986, and in Canada from 1986–1996, before returning to the UK in 1996. She remarried twice.

Filmography

Film

Television

Audio drama

References

External links
 
 Official website
 Details of Anneke Wills - In Focus

1941 births
People educated at the Arts Educational Schools
English film actresses
English television actresses
English people of Dutch descent
Living people
People from Bray, Berkshire
Actresses from London
20th-century English actresses
Alumni of RADA
Rajneesh movement